Tayakadın is a neighborhood of Arnavutköy district in Istanbul, Turkey. Istanbul Airport is located near the airport.

References

Arnavutköy, Istanbul
Neighbourhoods of Istanbul